Ingrid Kristina Sofia Eriksson (born 11 May 1979) is a Swedish former football player, who played the position of left back. She played for the club side Umeå IK and for the Swedish national football team.

National team

Sofia Eriksson represented Sweden 14 times and scored one goal. At UEFA Women's Euro 2001, Eriksson scored a goal directly from a corner in a 4–0 win over England. Sweden would end up runners up losing to Germany by a golden goal.

Honours

Club 
Umeå IK
Damallsvenskan:
 Champion (3): 2000, 2001, 2002

Svenska Cupen Damer:
 Champion (4): 2001, 2002, 2003

UEFA Women's Cup:
 Champion (1): 2003
 Runner-up (1): 2002

International 
Sweden
UEFA Women's Championship:
 Runner-up (1): 2001

References

1979 births
Living people
Swedish women's footballers
Damallsvenskan players
Umeå IK players
Sweden women's international footballers
Women's association football fullbacks